Petri Kotwica (born 17 April 1964 in Pargas) is a Finnish film director and screenwriter. He is best known for his 2007 film Black Ice for which he received Jussi Awards for Best Director and Best Screenwriter.

Selected filmography

Koti-ikävä (2005)
Black Ice (2007)
Rat King (2012)
Henkesi edestä (2015)

References

External links

1964 births
Finnish film directors
Living people